DNS.com LLC was an American Domain Name System service website which evolved into a brand. In March 2014 it was re-branded dnsbycomodo.com.

History
The website, founded in 1991, was administrated by Dan Kimball (CEO), Brian Smith (CTO), Sean Stafford (COO) and Eric Radtke (CMO).  In 2010, Comwired Inc. acquired the site and began offering its enterprise DNS service from it. In February 2011, DNS.com was acquired by cybersecurity company Comodo.

See also
DNS hosting service
Anycast

External links
 Official website
 Business profile at BusinessWeek

References

Alternative Internet DNS services
Internet properties established in 1991
Internet technology companies of the United States
Defunct companies based in Louisville, Kentucky
Comodo Group
1991 establishments in the United States